Thomas Nelson House, also known as Forest Hill, is a historic home located at Boonville, Cooper County, Missouri. It was  built in 1843, and is a two-story, Greek Revival style brick dwelling with a rear ell. Symmetrical, flanking one-story wings were added about 1946. It has a side gable roof and features a two-story gabled, pedimented front portico, constructed about 1853.  The house is in the George Caleb Bingham painting "Forest Hill the Nelson Homestead."

It was listed on the National Register of Historic Places in 1990.

References

Houses on the National Register of Historic Places in Missouri
Greek Revival houses in Missouri
Houses completed in 1843
1843 establishments in Missouri
Houses in Cooper County, Missouri
National Register of Historic Places in Cooper County, Missouri
Boonville, Missouri